Ramón Martín del Campo (born 5 July 1993) is a Mexican former  professional footballer.

Career

Early career
Prior to college, Martin del Campo started his soccer career playing for F.C. San Diego while also playing on the Bonita Vista High School varsity soccer team, which he helped lead to the CIF San Diego Section Division II Championship.

From 2011 to 2014, he went on to play four seasons of college soccer at the University of California, Davis. His strong performance was rewarded with a call to the United States National U23 Team (one of 19 players in the nation) for a week-long camp in the Bahamas in early August 2014. In the summer of 2014, he joined the San Jose Earthquakes' U23 Premier Development League squad, helping lead his side to a 7–4–3 record and a third-place finish in the Western Conference in its inaugural season. His performance that year led him to be one of three finalists for the PDL's Young Player of the Year Award.

Professional
Ramon Martin del Campo signed his first professional contract MLS prior to the 2015 MLS SuperDraft. He, however, went undrafted and his contract was subsequently voided. He later went on trial with LA Galaxy but was released in pre-season without a contract.

Deportivo Saprissa
In June 2015, he signed a two-year contract with Deportivo Saprissa after a recommendation by former MLS and Saprissa player Daniel Torres.

Puerto Rico FC
On May 12, 2016, Puerto Rico FC announced that Martin del Campo will join the club for this upcoming season on loan from Deportivo Saprissa.

Ottawa Fury
On January 10, 2017, Martin del Campo signed with United Soccer League side Ottawa Fury.

Fresno FC
On January 24, 2018, Martin del Campo signed with United Soccer League side Fresno FC for the 2018 season.

Las Vegas Lights
Following Fresno FC folding at the end of the 2019 season, del Campo signed with USL Championship side Las Vegas Lights FC on December 9, 2019, ahead of their 2020 season.

OKC Energy
On September 16, 2020, del Campo moved USL Championship side OKC Energy.

Miami FC
On January 7, 2021, USL Championship side Miami FC announced it had signed del Campo.

After playing every minute of Miami's first three matches, del Campo announced his retirement from professional soccer on May 22, 2021.

References

External links 
 

1993 births
Living people
American soccer players
American sportspeople of Mexican descent
UC Davis Aggies men's soccer players
San Jose Earthquakes U23 players
Deportivo Saprissa players
Puerto Rico FC players
Ottawa Fury FC players
Fresno FC players
Las Vegas Lights FC players
OKC Energy FC players
Miami FC players
American expatriate soccer players
American expatriate sportspeople in Costa Rica
Association football defenders
Footballers from Sonora
Sportspeople from Hermosillo
University of California, Davis alumni
USL League Two players
North American Soccer League players
USL Championship players
Soccer players from California
Sportspeople from Chula Vista, California
Mexican footballers